Sir Rogério Hyndman Lobo, CBE, JP (15 September 1923 – 18 April 2015), generally known as Roger Lobo, was a British Hong Kong businessman, philanthropist and politician.

He was a member of the Urban Council, Executive Council and Legislative Council. He was famous for his Lobo Motion in Legislative Council of Hong Kong during the negotiation of the future of Hong Kong between the United Kingdom and the PRC in early 1980s.

Early life
Lobo was born in September 1923 of Hong Kong-Macanese, Portuguese and Scottish descent. His father, Pedro José Lobo, had moved from Portuguese Timor to Macau between late 19th century and early 20th century. He settled in Macau and married Branca Hyndman, the great granddaughter of Scottish-born Colonel Henry Hyndman, who served in the British East India Company at Bengal and whose son Henrique settled in Macau either in the late 18th or early 19th century. Pedro José Lobo was a famous and important businessman, politician and philanthropist of Macau. He studied in the Lyceum in Macau and La Salle College in Hong Kong. After his study, Lobo joined his father's business in 1945.

Political life
Lobo was appointed as a member of the  Urban Council on 1 April 1965. He was a member of the Executive Council between 1967–85, the Legislative Council between 1972-85 (the Senior Unofficial Member between 1980–85) and the Urban Council between 1965-78.

On 14 March 1984, Lobo tabled the famous Lobo Motion in the Legislative Council:

Other public services
Lobo participated in many public services in Hong Kong, including the Civil Aid Service, of which he became the commissioner in 1977, and was also appointed as the head of Hong Kong Broadcasting Authority.

Personal life
Rogério Lobo married Margaret Mary Choa; they had five sons and five daughters, as well as 28 grandchildren and 17 great-grandchildren.

Honours and awards
Lobo was appointed an Officer of the Most Excellent Order of the British Empire (OBE) in 1972 and a Commander of the Most Excellent Order of the British Empire (CBE) in 1978. He was knighted as a Knight Bachelor in 1984.

He was awarded the degree of Doctor of Laws honoris causa by The University of Hong Kong in 1982.

References

Sources
 Urban Council, Urban Council Annual Report, 1974
 Forjaz, Jorge. Familias Macaenses. Macau: Instituto Portugues do Oriente, 1996; .

External links
 Honorary Graduates from the University of Hong Kong

1923 births
2015 deaths
British businesspeople
British people of Portuguese descent
British people of Scottish descent
Commanders of the Order of the British Empire
Members of the Urban Council of Hong Kong
Hong Kong businesspeople
Hong Kong Civic Association politicians
Hong Kong people of Portuguese descent
Hong Kong people of Scottish descent
Knights Bachelor
Macanese people
Members of the Executive Council of Hong Kong
Members of the Legislative Council of Hong Kong
20th-century British philanthropists